"Roses Are Red" is a 1988 single by The Mac Band featuring The McCampbell Brothers. The single was their most successful of six chart singles on the US Billboard Hot Black Singles chart, peaking at number one for one week on that chart. "Roses Are Red" did not chart on the Billboard Hot 100. It did, however, reach number 8 on the UK Singles Chart.  The song was produced by LA Reid and Kenneth "Babyface" Edmonds.

Charts

References

1988 singles
1988 songs
Songs written by L.A. Reid
Songs written by Babyface (musician)
Song recordings produced by L.A. Reid
Song recordings produced by Babyface (musician)
MCA Records singles